Macrosaccus morrisella (hog peanut moth) is a moth of the family Gracillariidae. In North America it is known from Manitoba, Ontario, and Quebec, south and west to Texas and Colorado.

The wingspan is 6–7 mm.

The larvae feed on Amphicarpaea bracteata, Strophostyles leiosperma, and soybean (Glycine max). They mine the leaves of their host plant. The mine begins as an elongate serpentine track on the underside of the leaflet. This enlarges to an elongate-oval, whitish blotch which eventually becomes strongly tentiform.

Gallery

References

External links
Bug Guide
mothphotographersgroup
Macrosaccus at microleps.org
Life cycle images

Lithocolletinae
Moths described in 1859

Moths of North America
Lepidoptera of Canada
Lepidoptera of the United States
Leaf miners
Taxa named by Asa Fitch